State Route 127 (SR 127) is a  state highway that serves the north-central areas of Limestone County in the north-central part of the U.S. state of Alabama. SR 127 intersects SR 99 at its southern terminus in Athens and continues as Tennessee State Route 166 (SR 166) upon entering Tennessee at its northern terminus.

Route description
SR 127 begins at an intersection with SR 99 (running concurrently with Elm Street) opposite Jefferson Street in northern Athens. From this point, the highway travels in a northerly direction before turning in a northwesterly direction north of Elkmont. SR 127 continues in its northwesterly path in crossing the Elk River prior to reaching the Tennessee state line and continues as SR 166.

Major intersections

See also

References

External links

127
Transportation in Limestone County, Alabama